The following list consists of notable concepts that are derived from Hindu culture and associated cultures (Indian, Nepali, Balinese) traditions, which are expressed as words in Sanskrit or other Indic languages and Dravidian languages. The main purpose of this list is to disambiguate multiple spellings, to make note of spellings no longer in use for these concepts, to define the concept in one or two lines, to make it easy for one to find and pin down specific concepts, and to provide a guide to unique concepts of Hinduism all in one place.

Separating concepts in Hinduism from concepts specific to Indian culture, or from the language itself, can be difficult. Many Sanskrit concepts have an Indian secular meaning as well as a Hindu dharmic meaning. One example is the concept of Dharma. Sanskrit, like all languages, contains words whose meanings differ across various contexts.

A
Arti Hindu ritual for welcoming someone.
Abhisheka  Hindu bathing ritual offered to someone who is worshipped.
Acharya  Hindu religious expert in any field.
Adharma  Something against Dharma.
Adivasis  Indian term for tribal people.
Advaita non-dual, such as in Advaita Vedanta Philosophy.
Agastya  Hindu sage.
Agni  Fire god.
Ahamkara  Sanskrit term for "ego".
Akshaya Tritiya  Annual spring festival for Hindus and Jains.
Añjanā  Mother of Hanuman.
Antahkarana  Totality of mind.
Antyesti  Last death ritual.
Ashram  Hindu monastery.
Asura  A semi-divine, power-seeking being. 
Ashvins  Hindu twin gods for medicine, health and science.
Ashwatthama  The son of Drona.
Aruna  The charioteer of Surya the Sun God.
Aryan  Group of Vedic people.
Astika  Orthodox (of Indian religions/schools of thought).
Atman Self or spirit.
Aupasana  Yagya performed during Hindu wedding.
Avarna  A person not belonging to any class in Varna system.
Avatar  Material appearance or incarnation of a deity on earth.
Ayurveda  A medical system of Indian subcontinent.

B
Bajrang Bali  Other name of Hanuman.
Bhagavad Gita  A knowledge of the attaining the supreme told to Arjuna by Krishna on the Kurukshetra battlefield.
Bhagavan  Bhagavan is a term used to refer to a god.
Bhagavata  Worship of Bhagavat Vishnu.
Bhagavati  A word for female Hindu deities.
Bhajan  A Hindu devotional song as a spiritual practice.
Bhakti  A Hindu word for faith, devotion or love to god. 
Bharat  India, and also used as a male name.
Bharata  Brother of Rama.
Bhargava  The descendants of the great rishi, Bhrigu.
Bhasmasura  Ancient legendary character in Hinduism.
Bhavana  Sense for calling into existence.
Bhumi  Earth goddess
Brahma  The Creator God.
Brahmaloka  The celestial abode of Brahma.
Brahmacharya  The first phase of a person's life where he goes to live with his guru to learn the different studies.
Brahman The Supreme Transcendental Awareness which pervades and yet transcends the manifest universe. Not to be confused with the god Brahma or the varna Brahmin.
Brahmin  The class or varna of people consisting of priests, teachers, sages and gurus.
Brahma Sutras  Sanskrit texts attributed by Sage Vyasa.
Brahmastra  Supernatural weapon as per Hindu texts.
Braj  Region associated with Radha and Krishna.
Buddhi  Intelligence or soul.

C
Catur Sloki Four most important verses among Hindu texts.
Chakra  Focal points in body activated during meditation.
Charu  Pure and spiritual person.
Chyavana  A great Bhargava rishi.
Chiranjivi  One who is immortal.
Chitta  Mind and its fluctuations.

D
Daitya A race of Asuras.
Dakini  Female spirit of demon as per Hindu mythology.
Dāna  Virtue of generosity.
Dasharatha  Father of Rama.
Dashavatara  The series of 10 Avatars of Vishnu.
Deva Term for deity in Hinduism.
Devi  Term for female deity in Hinduism.
Dharma  Following the divine and great path.
Dharmaśāstra  Hindu theological texts in Sanskrit.
Dhritarashtra  Father of Kaurava.
Dhyana  Meditation.
Dhaumya  A great sage who had three disciples - Aruni, Upamanyu and Veda.
Dilīpa  Hindu king of Ikshvaku dynasty.
Dhruva  Ascetic devotee of Vishnu.
Drona  Guru (or teacher) of Kauravas and Pandavas.
Dvaita  A branch of Hindu philosophy, founded by Shri Madhvacharya that advocates dualism and stresses a strict distinction between God and souls.
Dyaus  Rigvedic god of the  aether and sky

E
Ekalavya  Young Nishada prince and character in Mahabharata.
Ekayāna  Oneness of god in Hinduism.
Elapatra  A character in the Sarpa Satra.

F
Falgun  One of the month as per Hindu calendar.

G
Gandhara  Ancient Indian Mahajanapadas.
Gandhari  Wife of Dhritarashtra and mother of Kaurava.
Gandhari people  Ancient Hindu tribes in Mahabharata.
Gandharva  Rigvedic tribe.
Ganesha  The god of new beginnings, wisdom, and luck, commonly identified for his elephant head.
Ganga  A holy river in Northern India, believed to be a goddess by Hindus (see Ganga in Hinduism).
Gayatri Mantra  A revered mantra in Hinduism, found in the Yajur Veda.
Ghanta  Metal bell used during Hindu worship ritual.
Gita holy text/song/book, typically Bhagavad-gita, and many including Anugita, Ashtavakra Gita, Avadhuta Gita, Devi Gita, The Ganesha Gita, Gita Dhyanam, Gita Govinda, Guru Gita, Hamsa Gita, Yogi Gita.
Goloka  Spiritual abode of Radha Krishna.
Gopi  Milkmaids of Braj region who are revered as the consorts and devotees of Krishna. 
Gotra  Ancestral lineage among Hindus.
Grahana  Eclipse in Hindu mythology.
Grihastha  The second of the four phases (Purushartha) of a man, when a person gets married and settles down in life and begets children.
Guru  A spiritual teacher. In contemporary India, the title and term "Guru" is widely used within the general meaning of "wise man".

H
Hanuman  A vanara who helped Rama, the seventh avatar of Vishnu, in rescuing his wife Sita from the Rakshasa king Ravana.
Hindu scripture  Sacred texts of Hinduism mostly written in Sanskrit. Hindu scripture is divided into two categories: Śruti – that which is heard (i.e. revelation) and Smriti – that which is remembered (i.e. tradition, not revelation).
Hinduism  A worldwide religious tradition that is based on the Vedas and is the direct descendant of the Vedic religion. It encompasses many religious traditions that widely vary in practice, as well as many diverse sects and philosophies.
Himalayas  North Indian range of mountains, at least some holy (such as Mt Kailash being said to be Shiva's abode).

I
Indra  The chief deity of the Rigveda, the god of weather and war as well as Lord of Svargaloka in Hinduism.
Ishvara  A Hindu philosophical concept of God referring to the Supreme Being which is the lord and the ruler of everything. Hinduism uses the term Ishvara exclusively to refer to the Supreme God in a monotheistic sense.

J
Janeu  Sacred thread worn by Hindus, especially by Brahmin after the rite of Upanayana.
Japa  A spiritual discipline in which a devotee repeats a mantra or the name of God. The repetition can be aloud, just the movement of lips or in the mind.
Jiva  A living being.
Jivanmukta  A liberated living individual.
Jnana  Knowledge.
Jnana Yoga  Knowledge Yoga.

K
Kailasha  The celestial abode of the destroyer deity, Shiva.
Kali Kaivalya : Independence (a goal in Yoga Sutra).
Kali  A dark, black aspect of the mother-goddess Devi whose consort is Shiva.
Kali Purusha  The demonic and evil personification of Kali Yuga.
Kali Yuga  Last of four yugas in Hindu cosmology.
Kalki  The tenth avatar of Vishnu who is yet to come and will appear as a man on a horse at the end of Kali Yuga.
Kama  Best understood as aesthetics, the definition of Kama involves sensual gratification, sexual fulfillment, pleasure of the senses, love, and the ordinary enjoyments of life regarded as one of the four ends of man (purusharthas).
Karma  A Sanskrit term that encompasses the entire cycle of cause and effect.
Karma Yoga  The practise of disciplining action. Karma yoga focuses on the adherence to duty (dharma) while remaining detached from the reward. It states that one can attain Moksha (salvation) by doing his duties in an unselfish manner.
Kartikeya  A god born out of a magical spark created by Shiva, his father. God of war, victory, and knowledge.
Krishna  The eighth avatar of Vishnu, one of the most worshipped by many Hindus. Krishna is famous for his lecture to Arjuna written in the Bhagavad Gita.
Kshatriya  The class or varna in Hindu tradition, consisting of the warriors, soldiers and rulers of society.
Kshira Sagara  The ocean of milk, an abode of Vishnu.
Kubera  One of the gods of wealth and riches.
Kumbha Mela a huge Hindu religious pilgrimage/gathering/festival every 12 years at Ganges and other sacred rivers, which many sanyasis (especially sadhus) attend.
Kurma  The second avatar of Vishnu where he took the form of a tortoise.

L
Lakshmi  Goddess of prosperity, wealth and good fortune. She is the consort of Vishnu and an aspect of Devi.

M
Mahabharata  One of the two major ancient Sanskrit epics of India, the other being the Ramayana. The Mahabharata is of religious and philosophical importance in India; in particular, the Bhagavad Gita, which is one of its chapters (Bhishmaparva) and a sacred text of Hinduism.
Maharishi  A great enlightened one or seer including ancient gurus/teachers/writers and speakers/poets/singers of sacred literature, especially the Vedas.
Manas  Root for Indo-European words such as mind
Mandir  Temple.
Manidvipa  Abode of the supreme goddess in Shaktism.
Mantra  A religious syllable or poem, typically from the Sanskrit language. They are primarily used as spiritual conduits, words and vibrations that instill one-pointed concentration in the devotee. Other purposes have included religious ceremonies to accumulate wealth, avoid danger, or eliminate enemies. Mantras are performed through chanting.
Mātali  The charioteer of Indra.
Matsya  The first avatar of Vishnu, where he came in the form of a fish.
Mitra  One of the Adityas.
Moksha  Refers to liberation from the cycle of death and rebirth. In higher Hindu philosophy, it is seen as a transcendence of phenomenal being, of any sense of consciousness of time, space, and causation (karma).
Mount Meru  A sacred mountain.

N
Naraka  Realm of punishment, the abode of Yama.
Narasimha  The fourth avatar of Vishnu. He is a mixed form of a man and a lion.
Nastika  Unorthodox (such as Dharmas which claim anatman).
Nirvana  Literally "extinction" and/or "extinguishing", is the culmination of the yogi's pursuit of liberation. Hinduism uses the word nirvana to describe the state of moksha, roughly equivalent to heaven.

O
Om (Also Aum, ॐ) is the most sacred syllable in Hinduism, first coming to light in the Vedic Tradition. The syllable is sometimes referred to as the "Udgitha" or "pranava mantra" (primordial mantra); not only because it is considered to be the primal sound, but also because most mantras begin with it.

P
Paramukta  A supremely liberated living individual
Parashurama  The sixth Avatar of Vishnu, where he came in the form of an axe-wielder in order to kill the corrupt kings at the time.
Parvati  Goddess of power and devotion, the consort of Shiva and mother of Ganesha.
Patala  The netherworld.
Pativrata  The conjugal fidelity of a wife towards her husband.
Pitrs  The spirits of departed ancestors.
Pralaya  Phenomenon of dissolution.
Purana Any of many Hindu legend/mythology texts.
Purushartha  The four chief aims of human life. Arranged from lowest to highest, these goals are: sensual pleasures (kama), worldly status and security (artha), personal righteousness and social morality (dharma), and liberation from the cycle of reincarnation (moksha).

R
Radha Hindu goddess of love and devotion. Radha is the chief consort of god Krishna who resides in Goloka. She is also revered as the avatar of Lakshmi.
Rama The Seventh Avatara of Vishnu. The life and heroic deeds of Rama are written in the Sanskrit epic, The Ramayana.
Ramayana  Part of the Hindu smriti, written by Valmiki. This epic of 24,000 verses in seven kandas (chapters or books) tells of a Raghuvamsa prince, Rama of Ayodhya, whose wife Sita is abducted by the rakshasa Ravana.
Rishi  An enlightened one or seer.
Rudra  A Rigvedic god of the storm, the hunt, death, nature and the wind. Rudra is an early form of Shiva and a name of Shiva in the Shiva sahasranama.
Rukmini The Hindu goddess of fortune. The chief queen consort of the Hindu deity Krishna, an avatar of Lakshmi.
Ruru The son of Pramati and grandson of Chyavana. He married Pramadvara, granddaughter of Vaivasvata Manu.

S
Sadhana Spiritual exercise by a Sadhu or a Sadhaka to attain moksha, which is liberation from the cycle of birth and death (Samsara), or a particular goal such as blessing from a deity.
Samadhi  A term used in yogic meditation. Samadhi is also the Hindi word for a structure commemorating the dead.
Samkhya  A school of philosophy emphasising a dualism between Purusha and Prakrti.
Samsara  Refers to the concept of reincarnation or rebirth in Indian philosophical traditions.
Samudra Manthana  The legend of the churning of the ocean.
Sanatana Dharma  The Eternal Order/Truth/Law (An endonym of Hinduism).
Sannyasa  Hindu ascetic/monastic (monk or nun) such as a Sanyasi, Sadhvine or Sadhu, Swami.
Saraswati  The goddess of education and knowledge, and consort of Brahma.
Shakta  A Hindu denomination which follows the Bhagavati/Devi/Shakti (Goddess).
Shakti  An aspect of Devi and a personification of God as the Divine Mother who represents the active, dynamic principles of feminine power.
Shiva  God of destruction, birth, death, time, and the arts; the Supreme Being/Ultimate Reality in Shaivism. A form of Ishvara or God in Shaivism. Śiva is commonly known as "the destroyer" and is the third god of the Trimurti.
Sita  The wife of Vishnu's seventh avatar Rama.
Shudra  The class or varna in Hindu tradition, consisting of farmers, servants and labourers.
Sloka  A verse of lines in Sanskrit, typically recited as a prayer.
Smarta  A Hindu denomination, which follows Advaita philosophy and considers that all gods are manifestations of Ishvar.
Smriti  A newer/secondary canon of Hindu texts/scriptures including auxiliary Vedic texts, epics, Dharma Sutras & Shastras, Artha Shastras, Puranas, poetry, reviews/commentary, digests.
Soma  A ritual drink of importance among Hindus. It is frequently mentioned in the Rigveda, which contains many hymns praising its energizing or intoxicating qualities.
Śruti  A canon of Hindu scriptures. Shruti is believed to have no author; rather a divine recording of the "cosmic sounds of truth", heard by rishis.
Sthala purana  A regional account of a temple legend.
Sthala Vriksha  A sacred tree associated with a temple.
Stotra  devotional hymn/song/mantras to a deva/devi.
Surya  A solar deity who is one of the three main Vedic Gods.
Sutra  Refers to an aphorism or a collection of such aphorisms in the form of a book or text.
Svaha  The goddess of sacrifices and the consort of Agni.
Svarga  The celestial abode of the devas.
Svayambhu  The concept of self-birth or self-manifestation.

T
Tantra  The esoteric Hindu traditions of rituals and yoga. Tantra can be summarised as a family of voluntary rituals modeled on those of the Vedas, together with their attendant texts and lineages.

U
Upanishad  Part of the Hindu Śruti scriptures which primarily discuss meditation and philosophy, seen as religious instructions by most schools of Hinduism.

V
Vaikuntha  The celestial abode of the preserver deity, Vishnu.
Vaishya  The class or varna in Hindu tradition consisting of merchants, traders, artisans, and landowners.
Vamana  The fifth Avatara of Vishnu. He is the first Avatar of Vishnu which had a completely human form, although it was that of a dwarf brahmin.
Vanaprastha  A person who is living in the forest as a hermit after giving up material desires.
Varaha  The third avatar of Vishnu, who came in the form of a boar.
Varna  Varna, according to Hindu scriptures, refers to the classification of people based on their qualities. The term is derived from the Sanskrit word, vr, which means "to describe," "to classify" or "to cover."
Varuna  A god of the sky, of rain and of the celestial ocean, as well as a god of law and of the underworld.
Vasu  Group of eight deities associated with fire and light.
Vayu  The god of air and wind who is also father of Bhima and Hanuman.
Veda  Collectively refers to a corpus of ancient Indo Aryan religious literature that are considered by adherents of Hinduism to be revealed knowledge. Many Hindus believe the Vedas existed since the beginning of creation.
Vedanta  Vedic Philosophy.
Vijnana  Mind or knowing The Divine.
Vishnu  God of Preservation. A form of God, to whom many Hindus pray. For Vaishnavas, He is the only Ultimate Reality or God. In Trimurti belief, He is the second aspect of God in the Trimurti (also called the Hindu Trinity), along with Brahma and Shiva. Known as the Preserver, He is most famously identified with His avatars, especially Krishna and Rama.
Vrata  Fast.

W
Wamika  God.

Y
Yajna  A Vedic ritual of sacrifice performed to please the Devas, or sometimes to the Supreme Spirit Brahman. Often it involves a fire, which represents the god Agni, in the centre of the stage and items are offered into the fire.
Yama  The lord of death in Hinduism, first recorded in the Vedas.
Yamas  A yama (Sanskrit), literally translates as a "restraint", a rule or code of conduct for living virtuously.
Yantra  A geometric picture, typically holy/religious.
Yoga  Philosophy of spiritual practices performed primarily as a means to enlightenment (or bodhi). Traditionally, Karma Yoga, Bhakti Yoga, Jnana Yoga, and Raja Yoga are considered the four main yogas. In the West, yoga has become associated with the asanas (postures) of Hatha Yoga, popular as fitness exercises.
Yogamaya  A goddess, regarded to be the embodiment of the divine energy of Vishnu.
Yoga Sutra  One of the six darshanas of Hindu or Vedic schools and, alongside the Bhagavad Gita and Hatha Yoga Pradipika, are a milestone in the history of Yoga.
Yuga  In Hindu philosophy (and in the teachings of Surat Shabd Yoga) the cycle of creation is divided into four yugas (ages or eras).
Yuga Dharma  One aspect of Dharma, as understood by Hindus. Yuga dharma is an aspect of dharma that is valid for a Yuga. The other aspect of dharma is Sanatan Dharma, dharma which is valid for eternity.

Z
Zaal  Trap.

References

Citation

Sources

See also 

 Outline of Hinduism
 Index of Hinduism-related articles

Hinduism terms
Hinduism
Wikipedia glossaries using description lists